Eridanus can refer to:

Rivers
Eridanos (mythology) (or Eridanus), a river in Greek mythology, somewhere in Central Europe, which was territory that Ancient Greeks knew only vaguely
The Po River, according to Roman word usage
Eridanos (Athens), a former river near Athens, now subterranean
Eridanos (geology), a former large river that flowed between forty million and seven hundred thousand years ago from Lapland to the North Sea through where the Baltic Sea is now

Astronomy
Eridanus (constellation), a southern constellation
Eridanus Cluster of galaxies in the constellation Eridanus
Eridanus II, a low-surface brightness dwarf galaxy in the constellation Eridanus
List of stars in Eridanus
Delta Eridani, a star
Eta Eridani, a star
Gamma Eridani, a star
Eridanus Supervoid, a large-scale cosmic underdensity

Miscellaneous
Éridan (rocket), a French rocket
Éridan-class minehunter, a class of French naval minehunters
Eridanosaurus, a rhinocerotid originally described as a crocodilian
USS Eridanus (AK-92), a ship of the United States Navy
Eridan Ampora, a character from the webcomic Homestuck